Roman Stepanovych Vanzuryak (born 13 April 1980, in Hlyboka, Soviet Union) is a Ukrainian customs officer and later politician, member of the Verkhovna Rada.

In 2006–2011 he worked as a customs officer at the Romania-Ukraine border in Chernivtsi Oblast (Vadul-Siret).

In 2008–2010 Vanzuryak was a member of Chernivtsi Oblast council.

In 2012–2014 he became a member of Verkhovna Rada representing the UDAR.

In 2014 Vanzuryak served as a Governor of Chernivtsi Oblast.

References

External links
 Profile at the Official Ukraine Today portal

1980 births
Living people
People from Chernivtsi Oblast
Chernivtsi University alumni
Governors of Chernivtsi Oblast
Seventh convocation members of the Verkhovna Rada
All-Ukrainian Union "Fatherland" politicians
Ukrainian Democratic Alliance for Reform politicians